Alexis Akrithakis (1939–1994) was a Greek contemporary artist renowned for his paintings and wooden constructions. His works have been described as "speaking an unmistakable language. They stand on their own and are original, but are yet influenced by the particular Zeitgeist - between Arte Povera and Actioninsm".

Born in Athens, Greece he lived and worked in Athens and Berlin, Germany. In 1968 he received a scholarship from DAAD and moved to Berlin. In 1972 his works were presented at the exhibition "Szene Berlin Mai ’72" at Württembergischer Kunstverein in Stuttgart curated by Christos M. Joachimides and co-organized with the René Block gallery.

Throughout the '70s he collaborated extensively with the prolific gallerist Alexander Iolas. Iolas exhibited his work in shows organized in Geneva (1971), Milan (1973), Turin (1973) and Athens (1971,1977)

He has created drawings for publications of key figures of Greek literature, poetry and philosophy such as Nanos Valaoritis, Kostas Tachtsis, Elias Petropoulos and others. In 2018 this aspect of his work was celebrated in an exhibition organized by the Municipal Gallery of Athens in the framework of the "Athens 2018 World Book Capital", curated by Denys Zacharopoulos.

His work has been included in major institutionally organized exhibitions such as the 12th Biennale of Alexandria held in the Alexandria Museum of Fine Art, Alexandria, Egypt, Europalia 1982 at the Bozar, Brussels, Belgium. In Greece his work has been included in major shows organized by the National Art Gallery–Alexandros Soutzos Museum such as "Metamorphoses of the Modern. The Greek experience" in 1992 as well as at  the founding exhibition of the Macedonian Museum of Contemporary Art in Thessaloniki in 1984.

His last solo exhibition was at the Ileana Tounta Gallery in Athens.

After his heart attack and subsequent death in 1994 both Greek museums organized large scale retrospective shows (Thessaloniki, 1997 and Athens, 1998) of his already recognized and critically acclaimed work.

In 2003 The Neue Nationalgalerie in Berlin honored him with a large scale retrospective show that ran at the same time with an exhibition of works of Pablo Picasso in the same museum.

His work "Eight Suitcases with Rubbish from a Beach" was featured in "Antidoron" an exhibition of the collection of National Museum of Contemporary Art of Athens, Greece presented in Kassel, Germany as a part of the Documenta 14 art exhibition.

His daughter Chloe Geitmann-Akrithaki (born 1969) is the sole owner of all copyrights in and to all the works of Alexis Akrithakis.

References 

1939 births
1994 deaths
20th-century Greek painters
Artists from Athens
Date of birth missing
Date of death missing